Jan Sijbrand Pesman (4 May 1931 – 23 January 2014) was a Dutch speed skater who specialized in long distances. He competed at the 1960 Winter Olympics in the 500 m, 5000 m and 10,000 m events and won a bronze medal in the 5000 m.

Pesman started competing in speed skating in his twenties, and took part in all major international events between 1957 and 1960. In 1959, he won the 5000 m event at the World Allround Speed Skating Championships and finished second in the 10,000 m; he won this event at the 1960 World Championships. He retired after the 1960 season.

References

External links

 skateresults

1931 births
2014 deaths
People from Loppersum
Dutch male speed skaters
Olympic bronze medalists for the Netherlands
Olympic medalists in speed skating
Olympic speed skaters of the Netherlands
Speed skaters at the 1960 Winter Olympics
Medalists at the 1960 Winter Olympics
Sportspeople from Groningen (province)